Marquitta is a 1927 French silent drama film directed by Jean Renoir and starring Jean Angelo, Marie-Louise Iribe and Henri Debain.

The film's sets were designed by the art director Robert-Jules Garnier. It was shot at the Gaumont studios in Paris and on location in Nice.

Cast
 Jean Angelo as Prince Vlasco 
 Marie-Louise Iribe as Marquitta 
 Henri Debain as Dimitrieff 
 Félix d'Aps as Granval 
 Simone Cerdan as Jeune femme 
 Andrée Vernon
 Lucien Mancini as Père adoptif 
 Pierre Lestringuez as Directeur du casino 
 Pierre Champagne as Chauffeur de taxi

References

Bibliography
 Martin O'Shaughnessy. Jean Renoir. Manchester University Press, 2000.

External links

1927 films
Films directed by Jean Renoir
French silent feature films
French black-and-white films
French drama films
1927 drama films
Films shot in Nice
Films set in Nice
Silent drama films
1920s French films